Ahmed Hassan Mahmoud is a paralympic athlete from Egypt competing mainly in category T37 sprint events.

Ahmed competed in three Paralympics firstly in 1992 where he competed in the C7 400m, winning a bronze medal.  In the 1996 Summer Paralympics in Atlanta he improved to win the T36 400m gold medal and also took bronze in the 100m and 200m.  His final appearance came in 2000 where he won a silver in the T37 400m and a bronze in the 200m as well as competing in the 100m.

References

External links
 

Year of birth missing (living people)
Living people
Paralympic athletes of Egypt
Paralympic gold medalists for Egypt
Paralympic silver medalists for Egypt
Paralympic bronze medalists for Egypt
Paralympic medalists in athletics (track and field)
Athletes (track and field) at the 1992 Summer Paralympics
Athletes (track and field) at the 1996 Summer Paralympics
Athletes (track and field) at the 2000 Summer Paralympics
Medalists at the 1992 Summer Paralympics
Medalists at the 1996 Summer Paralympics
Medalists at the 2000 Summer Paralympics
Egyptian male sprinters